Sphodros abboti also known as purseweb spider, is a species of spiders from a family of Atypidae. It was described by Charles Athanase Walckenaer in 1835 and is endemic to Florida, United States.

Description
The spider is black coloured, with eight legs, and purple back. It also has only two eyes. The males have blue abdomen, which attracts females.

Habitat
They construct webs on the middle part of a tree, that remind people of short vines.

References

Spiders described in 1835
Atypidae
Endemic fauna of the United States
Spiders of the United States